"Turn Back the Clock" is a song by the British band Johnny Hates Jazz. It is the title track of their debut album and was the third single release from the LP.

The song peaked at No. 12 in the UK top 40 in 1987. It also reached number five on the US Adult Contemporary chart. There is also a previously unreleased version, that has some minor changes from the original song, including more backing guitar, and saxophone.

Music video
The international music video for the song was directed by Brian Grant.  The video was filmed in Cold Spring, NY in fall 1987.

Critical reception
Upon its release as a single, Robin Smith of Record Mirror described "Turn Back the Clock" as "hopelessly twee and contrived" and added, "Rock out and loosen up, guys."

Charts

Weekly charts

Year-end charts

References

External links
Johnny Hates Jazz Official Website
  

1986 songs
1987 singles
Johnny Hates Jazz songs
Virgin Records singles
Number-one singles in Iceland
Songs written by Clark Datchler